Farrukh Zaman (born April 2, 1956, Peshawar, Khyber-Pakhtunkhwa) is a former Pakistani cricketer who played in one Test in 1976.Farrukh Zaman was a right-handed batsman and slow left-arm bowler who played cricket for more than two decades for Pakistan as well as Muslim Commercial Bank, KPK, Pakistan Railways, Peshawar Cricket Association and Punjab. Opportunity to represent in a test. His son Fahad Zaman (born 22 December 1988) also played cricket for Pakistan U-19 and Peshawar.

Single Test cricket
Farrukh Zaman was named in the squad for the 1976 Test against New Zealand in Hyderabad. Pakistan had earlier scored 473 runs with eight wickets in hand. Sadiq Mohammad 103, Mushtaq Mohammad 101, Majid Khan 98 and Asif Iqbal 73 were the prominent scorers in this big score. The Pakistani batsmen decorated the stadium with their charming stokes without taking the Kiwi bowlers into consideration. Due to declaring the innings, Farrukh Zaman, who came on the field with many aspirations, did not get a chance to bat. In reply, the New Zealand team could not hold the batting length and the entire team returned to the pavilion for 219 runs. The fate of New Zealand would have been even worse had it not been for the help of Galen Turner 49, Mark Butches 33 and Robert Anderson 30. From Pakistan, Sarfraz 53/3, Imran Khan 41/3 and Javed Miandad 20/2 were prominent. John Parker's 82 in the second innings helped New Zealand score 254 runs. This time Intikhab Alam 44/4, Sarfraz 45/2, Javed Miandad 74/3 were the cause of trouble for Kiwi players. Pakistan got a target of just 3 runs to win which they won by 10 wickets without losing a wicket. Thus Farrukh Zaman could not play any important role in this Test in both bowling and batting but the victory of the Pakistani team gave him the honor that he took part in the victory of the team without showing any performance in his test.

statistics
Farrukh Zaman participated in a Test but did not get a chance to bat while he remained unbeaten 57 times in 192 innings of 137 first class matches and scored 1420 runs. Of those runs averaged 10.51, 54 was his highest score in a single innings. His record also includes 3 half centuries and 57 catches. Farrukh Zaman scored 11225 runs in first class matches and caught 403 players in his clutches. 7/42 Their best performance they achieved with an average of 27.85. 14 times for 5 or more wickets in a single innings. After retiring from cricket, Farrukh Zaman chose the field of umpiring. Umpired in 13 first class matches

1956 births
Living people
Farrukh Zaman
Farrukh Zaman
Pakistani cricketers
Peshawar cricketers
Pakistan Railways B cricketers
Punjab (Pakistan) cricketers
Muslim Commercial Bank cricketers
Cricketers from Peshawar
Edwardes College alumni